"King of Sorrow" is a song by English band Sade from their fifth studio album, Lovers Rock (2000). It was released as the album's second and final single on 12 March 2001.

Critical reception
Tanya Rena Jefferson of AXS wrote, "Sade sings a heartfelt song that is sad and deep of sorrow and no one can take her sorrows away. This song allows one to feel very dark inside, yet the music gives a sense of overwhelming soulful bliss that takes away the blues feeling of the song." A reviewer from People Magazine noted that "even such sad songs", as “King of Sorrow”, "attest to the adage that what doesn’t kill you makes you stronger." Frank Guan of Vulture said it "witnesses Sade anointing herself a monarch. Whether it's to memorialize romantic pain or to recover from it, the act of aggrandizement is easily forgiven."

Music video
The music video for "King of Sorrow", directed by Sophie Muller, was filmed at and around the Normandie Hotel in San Juan, Puerto Rico and Ponce, Puerto Rico. It follows the dilemma of a single mother struggling to conciliate her children's needs with her dream of becoming a singer. The video was inspired by the 1960 French-Italian film Two Women, starring Sophia Loren.

Track listings
UK CD 1
"King of Sorrow" (Radio Version) – 3:48
"King of Sorrow" (Guru Remix) – 3:47

UK CD 2 and Dutch CD maxi single
"King of Sorrow" (Radio Version) – 3:48
"King of Sorrow" (Guru Remix) – 3:47
"King of Sorrow" (Fun Lovin' Criminals Remix) – 4:32
"King of Sorrow" (Cottonbelly Remix) – 5:57
"King of Sorrow" (Video)

UK and European 12-inch maxi single
A1. "King of Sorrow" (Guru Remix) – 3:47
A2. "King of Sorrow" (Fun Lovin' Criminals Remix) – 4:32
B1. "King of Sorrow" (Cottonbelly Remix) – 5:57
B2. "King of Sorrow" (Radio Version) – 3:48

UK 12-inch promotional single
A. "King of Sorrow" (Yard Mix) – 3:59
B. "King of Sorrow" (Yard Mix Version) – 3:59

Charts

References

2000 songs
2000s ballads
2001 singles
Contemporary R&B ballads
Epic Records singles
Music videos directed by Sophie Muller
Sade (band) songs
Songs written by Sade (singer)
Songs written by Stuart Matthewman
Soul ballads